J. Edward Holt (born 1880) was an English footballer who played as an outside right. Born in Withington, Lancashire, he played for Newton Heath Athletic and on a trial basis for Newton Heath. He made his only appearance in the Football League for Newton Heath on 28 April 1900, scoring in a 2–1 win over Chesterfield at Bank Street.

External links
Profile at MUFCInfo.com

1880 births
English footballers
Manchester United F.C. players
People from Withington
Year of death missing
Association football outside forwards